Net and wall games are court games where either a net separates the opponents or a wall serves to reflect the ball to the opponent. The object of these games is to hit the ball or bird over the net or against the wall back to the opponent. Play typically begins with one side serving the ball/bird by initially tossing or releasing it and then hitting it over the net. This then starts a rally, in which the sides alternate hitting the ball/bird over the net. Players then score points whenever the opponent fails to return the ball/bird back over the net. The criteria on what is considered a valid return varies between each sport (such as the number of times the ball may be touched or bounced on a player's side before it must go back over the net).

Net and wall games usually include:

 racquet sports such as tennis, badminton, pickleball, table tennis, squash, racquetball.
 volleyball, footvolley, Jokgu, headis, roundnet or sepak takraw, where players must hit the ball with body.

Although basketball, hockey, water polo, Football and other sports have netting around the goal area designed to more clearly indicate when goals are scored, they are not usually considered "net games", since the net is not used to separate the teams involved, Similarly, lacrosse sticks have a loose netting that is used to catch and fling the ball, but again lacrosse is not usually considered a "net game".

The Los Angeles Daily Times reports: "Net sports are unique in that the equipment is light, portable and affordable, and partners and opponents are easy to find. The sports are easy to learn, and the social aspect of the game[s] appeals to those who find the health club to be an isolationist palace of mirrors."

The three most popular net and wall games (tennis, badminton, and volleyball) usually involve arching of the back when serving or spiking/smashing the ball or bird.

References

Ball games
Racket sports